The Escala and Corda XV Professional League 05–06 of the Circuit Bancaixa is the top-level championship of the Valencian pilota, organized by the firm ValNet, on the Escala i corda variant.

It is played in several rounds. The first two ones are a league all-against all; the two worst teams are disqualified. Every victory is worth 3 points, but if the losing team attains 50 jocs they sum up 1 point. This way, in the first round there are eight teams, in the second round there are six teams, and four in the semi-finals. The finals are played to the best of 3 matches.

Teams
 Alcàsser
 Núñez, Fèlix and Jesús
 Benidorm
 Genovés II and Tino
 Llíria
 Víctor, Solaz and Melchor
 Pedreguer
 León and Sarasol II
 Petrer
 Miguel and Dani
 València
 Pedro, Grau and Salva
 Vila-real
 Mezquita, Tato and Canari
 Hidra-L'Eliana
 Álvaro and Pigat III

Feridors
 Miguelín (Miguel Ángel Bas López) and Pedrito (Pedro Ruiz Carrilero)

Replacing players
 Escalaters:
 Adrián I, Cervera and Colau
 Mitgers and punters:
 Bernat, Oñate,  Raül II, and Voro

Statistics

1st Round

2nd round

Semi-finals

Finals

Honor gallery
 Champion:

 Mezquita, Tato and Canari
 Runner-up:
 Hidra-L'Eliana
 Álvaro and Pigat III

Seasons of the Circuit Bancaixa
 Circuit Bancaixa 04/05
 Circuit Bancaixa 06/07
 Circuit Bancaixa 07/08

References 

Valencian pilota competitions
Valencian pilota professional leagues